DZRJ is the callsign of Rajah Broadcasting Network's three flagship stations in Metro Manila:

DZRJ-AM, AM radio 810 kHz
DZRJ-FM 100.3 MHz, branded on-air as RJ 100.3
DZRJ-TV television, channel 29

Broadcast call sign disambiguation pages